Kay Susan Tayo! is a Philippine television informative public affairs show broadcast by GMA Network. Hosted by Susan Enriquez, it premiered on November 30, 2003, on the network's morning line up. The show concluded on October 25, 2009, with a total of 309 episodes. It was replaced by Eateria in its timeslot.

The show is streaming online on YouTube.

Overview

Kay Susan Tayo! is all about health, lifestyles, and beauty. It mostly talks about health problems and its solutions, different lifestyles, businesses, beauty advice, and any magazine topics.

Ratings
According to AGB Nielsen Philippines' Mega Manila household television ratings, the final episode of Kay Susan Tayo! scored a 7.8% rating.

Accolades

References

External links
 

2003 Philippine television series debuts
2009 Philippine television series endings
Filipino-language television shows
GMA Network original programming
GMA Integrated News and Public Affairs shows
Philippine television shows